Medny (masculine), Mednaya (feminine), or Mednoye (neuter) is the name of several rural localities in Russia:
Medny (rural locality), a settlement under the administrative jurisdiction of Verkh-Isetsky City District of the City of Yekaterinburg in Sverdlovsk Oblast
Mednoye, Tambov Oblast, a selo in Satinsky Selsoviet of Sampursky District in Tambov Oblast
Mednoye, Tver Oblast, a selo in Mednovskoye Rural Settlement of Kalininsky District in Tver Oblast